María José Vargas Barrientos (born 15 February 1996) is a Costa Rican racing cyclist, who rides for Costa Rican amateur team Asfaltos CBZ. She competed at the 2020 Summer Olympics.

Major results

2014
 1st  Time trial, National Junior Road Championships
2015
 3rd Time trial, National Road Championships
2016
 National Road Championships
2nd Time trial
3rd Road race
2017
 National Road Championships
2nd Road race
3rd Time trial
2018
 National Road Championships
1st  Time trial
1st  Road race
 3rd Overall Vuelta Internacional Femenina a Costa Rica
1st Points classification
1st Young rider classification
1st Stage 3
 5th Gran Premio Comite Olimpico Nacional Femenino
 6th Time trial, Central American and Caribbean Games
2019
 Central American Road Championships
1st  Road race
3rd  Time trial
 National Road Championships
1st  Time trial
2nd Road race
2020
 2nd  Road race, Central American Road Championships
2021
 2nd  Road race, Central American Road Championships
 National Road Championships
2nd Time trial
3rd Road race

References

External links
 
 

1996 births
Living people
Costa Rican female cyclists
Place of birth missing (living people)
Olympic cyclists of Costa Rica
Cyclists at the 2020 Summer Olympics